This was the 1992–93 Alpenliga season, the second season of the Alpenliga, a multi-national ice hockey league. 16 teams participated in the league, and HC Alleghe won the championship by defeating HC Bozen in the final.

Regular season

Play-offs

Semi-finals
Devils Mailand (1) – Alleghe (4): 3:8 (1:1, 1:1, 1:6)
VSV (2) – Bozen (3): 1:5 (0:0, 0:1, 1:4)

3rd place
VSV (2) – Devils Milano (1): 5:4 (3:1, 1:3, 1:0)

Final
Bozen (3) – Alleghe (4): 4:7 (2:1, 1:3, 1:3)

External links
1992-93 season

Alpenliga seasons
2
Alpenliga
Alpenliga